Steve Goodall (born 28 October 1956) is an Australian racing cyclist, who won the 1978 Commonwealth Games Bronze Medal for the 1500 metres Tandem and placed 12th out of 30 competitors in the 1976 Summer Olympics 1000 metres Individual Time Trial.

References

External links 
 Australian Commonwealth Games Cycling Medalists
Totten Street, Bundaberg Qld

1956 births
Living people
Commonwealth Games bronze medallists for Australia
Cyclists from Queensland
Cyclists at the 1978 Commonwealth Games
Sportsmen from Queensland
Australian male cyclists
Olympic cyclists of Australia
Cyclists at the 1976 Summer Olympics
Commonwealth Games medallists in cycling
20th-century Australian people
Medallists at the 1978 Commonwealth Games